The Solid Air Diamant Twin is a German ultralight trike, designed and produced by Solid Air UL-Bau Franz of Hundheim, Rheinland-Pfalz. The aircraft is supplied as a complete ready-to-fly-aircraft.

Design and development
It features a cable-braced hang glider-style high-wing, weight-shift controls, a two-seats-in-side-by-side configuration open cockpit with a cockpit fairing, tricycle landing gear with wheel pants and a single engine in pusher configuration.

The aircraft fuselage is made from fibreglass, with its double surface aluminum-framed wing covered in Dacron sailcloth. Unusually the engine firewall is made from fibreglass-laminated plywood. Its  span standard Bautek Pico wing is supported by a single tube-type kingpost and uses an "A" frame weight-shift control bar. The landing gear features fibreglass suspension. The powerplant is a horizontally opposed, four-cylinder, air-cooled, two-stroke, dual-ignition  Hirth F-30 engine or, optionally a BMW four stroke powerplant.

A number of different wings can be fitted to the basic carriage, including the Bautek Pico and the La Mouette Ghost 12 and 14.

Specifications (Diamant Twin with Bautek Pico wing)

References

External links

2000s German sport aircraft
2000s German ultralight aircraft
Single-engined pusher aircraft
Ultralight trikes
Solid Air aircraft